Lipararchis aspilus is a moth in the family Crambidae. It is found in Australia, where it has been recorded from the Northern Territory.

The wingspan is 25 mm. The forewings are uniform whitish-brown. The hindwings are whitish, thinly scaled, towards apex slightly brownish-tinged. Adults have been recorded on wing in November.

References

Moths described in 1915
Spilomelinae